Sanford House, also known as Sanford Residence, is a historic home designed by Ward Wellington Ward and built in 1913.  It was listed on the National Register of Historic Places in 1997.

It was listed for its architecture.

References

Houses in Syracuse, New York
National Register of Historic Places in Syracuse, New York
Houses on the National Register of Historic Places in New York (state)
Houses completed in 1913